Gates Bar-B-Q is one of two Kansas City, Missouri restaurants (along with Arthur Bryant's) that trace their roots back to Henry Perry, founder of Kansas City barbecue.

Founded
Gates Bar-B-Q is a Kansas City original family restaurant that started in 1946. It has grown from a single storefront at 19th and Vine to a family of six up-to-date restaurants throughout the Kansas City metropolitan area. This neighborhood saw the rise of the famous Henry Perry restaurant as well as the 18th & Vine Jazz District. Gates was founded by George and Arzelia Gates, their three children (Winnifred, Gwendolyn, and Ollie), and the cook, Arthur Pinkard, who had been a cook for Perry.

In popular culture
Gate's Bar-B-Q is featured prominently in the lyrics and video of rapper Tech N9ne's song "O.G." The title and cover of the 2010 album the song is featured on, The Gates Mixed Plate, make further references to the restaurant. Tech N9ne has also referred to Ollie Gates in numerous songs over his career.

Gates and Sons is referenced in lyrics for Sir Mix-a-Lot's song "A Rapper's Reputation" from the 1992 album Mack Daddy.

See also
 List of barbecue restaurants

References

External links
 Official website
 Kansas City Barbecue History
Kansas City Public Library History

Restaurants in Kansas City, Missouri
Barbecue restaurants in the United States
Culture of Kansas City, Missouri
Restaurants in Missouri
Restaurants established in 1946
1946 establishments in Missouri